Tofol village in Lelu Town municipality is the capital of the state of Kosrae in Micronesia, according to the provisions of the Kosrae State Code, Title 2, Chap. 2. It is the most easterly point of Micronesia.

Location
Tofol is in Lelu municipality, located almost directly southwest of Lelu Island.

Education
Kosrae State Department of Education operates public schools:
 Kosrae High School

References

Municipalities of Kosrae